Anne Lee Plunket, Lady Plunket  (née Guinness; 1839 – 8 November 1889) was an Irish philanthropist.

Biography
Anne Lee Guinness was born in 1839, and was the only daughter of Sir Benjamin Lee Guinness, 1st Baronet. While her father was restoring St Patrick's Cathedral, Dublin, she became involved in causes helping the poor and sick in that area of Dublin, sponsoring bible readings and basic medical supplies. This led to her establishing St Patrick's nursing home in 1876, which became a training centre for Church of Ireland nurses.

Guinness married William Plunket, 4th Baron Plunket on 11 June 1863. The couple had two sons and four daughters, William Plunket, 5th Baron Plunket, Elizabeth Charlotte Plunket, Most Rev. Hon. Benjamin Plunket, Hon. Olivia Anne Plunket, Hon. Kathleen Louisa Plunket, and Hon. Ethel Josephine Plunket. The dowry that Guinness brought to the marriage, £49,000, allowed Plunket to extend their home at Old Connaught House and restore the walled garden.

Her husband supported Guinness' work at St Patrick's, and she in turn assisted in her educational projects including an extension of Alexandra College and the establishment of the Irish Clergy Daughters’ School at Earlsfort Terrace, Dublin. For large portion of her life, Guinness suffered from a degenerative illness, dying at Old Connaught House on 8 November 1889. She is buried at Mount Jerome Cemetery in the Guinness family vault. She is commemorated with a series of stained-glass windows depicting the works of Dorcas in St Patrick's Cathedral.

References

1839 births
1889 deaths
Plunket
Daughters of baronets
Anne Lee Guinness
Irish Anglicans
19th-century Irish philanthropists
19th-century Irish businesspeople
19th-century women philanthropists